GFL Championship Football is a 1986 video game published by Activision.

Gameplay
GFL Championship Football is a game in which the player receives a view from inside the helmet.

Reception
Wyatt Lee reviewed the game for Computer Gaming World, and stated that "Whatever one's feelings about the game, when the plus yardage and minus yardage is added together, this action/strategy game is a watershed design."

Reviews
Computer and Video Games - Jul, 1987

References

External links
Review in Antic
Review in ANALOG Computing
Review in Family Computing
Review in Ahoy!
Review in Crash
Review in Your Computer
Review in Current Notes
Article in InCider
Review in Zzap!
Review in Commodore Magazine
Review in Compute!'s Gazette

1986 video games
Activision games
American football video games
Amiga games
Amstrad CPC games
Atari ST games
Commodore 64 games
DOS games
First-person video games
Video games developed in the United States
Video games set in the United States
ZX Spectrum games